Dave Rowley is an insurance agent and politician serving as the Iowa State Senator from the 1st district since 2021. A member of the Republican Party, he defeated Democrat Mark Lemke in a special election on December 14, 2021, to serve the remainder of Republican Zach Whiting's term.

Personal life
Rowley is also a musician.

Electoral history

References

External links

Republican Party Iowa state senators
Living people
21st-century American politicians
Year of birth missing (living people)